Kilmahew Burn is a small river, burn, that runs from the Kilmahew estate into the Firth of Clyde. It flows close by the ruins of Kilmahew Castle and St Peter's Seminary and passes through the town of Cardross. The bridge over it in Cardross that carries the main road is named Moore's Bridge and was built in 1688.

References 

Rivers of Argyll and Bute